The Royal Oak is a 200 year old pub and folk music venue in the Scottish capital city, Edinburgh. It is well known for its live music sessions and counts various high profile Scottish musicians amongst its former resident performers, such as Kris Drever, Bobby Eaglesham, Danny Kyle and Karine Polwart.

During the 1960s, The Royal Oak was owned by the former Heart of Midlothian footballer Alan Anderson, though during his time there, it was called 'The Pivot'. It gained a reputation as a folk music venue after Dorothy Taylor took over the pub in 1978, which she ran alongside her sister Sandra – a former star of The White Heather Club TV Show – until 2003, when the current licensee Heather Mckenzie took over.

In 2008, Magic Park Records recorded and released an album featuring musicians from the Royal Oak, entitled 'The Royal Oak: Best of Folk' and The Royal Oak's resident folk club (The Wee Folk Club) was awarded 'Club of the Year' at the annual Scots Trad Music Awards.

The Royal Oak features in Ian Rankin's 'Set in Darkness', an Inspector Rebus novel. The scene is – according to Rankin – his favourite of all the pub scenes in the Rebus series.

References

Year of establishment missing
Pubs in Edinburgh
Music venues in Edinburgh